Samantha Davies may refer to:

Samantha Davies (sailor), British yachtswoman
Samantha Davies (sprinter), British sprinter

See also
Sam Davies (disambiguation)